A Formal Sigh were a new wave band from Liverpool, England, that formed in 1980 and broke up early in 1982.

Biography
A Formal Sigh formed around the kernel of Mark Peters (bass guitar) and Flo Sullivan (vocals and keyboards). Robin Surtees (guitar) joined the pair within days. He was followed, after several auditions and temporary drummers, by Roger Sinek (drums) and Greg Milton (guitar and bass). Mark Peters had previously played with The Names (aka The Famous Names).

The band recorded a session for John Peel on 5 September 1981, in the BBC Maida Vale 4 studio. Altered Images had been in the studio the day before. The Peel session was produced by Dale Griffin, ex-drummer of Mott the Hoople, and engineered by Mike Robinson. Peel was, in his own words, ‘rather partial’ to the tape and played it several times, beginning on 10 September 1981. The session was also broadcast several times on Radio Merseyside. A Formal Sigh were for a while the darlings of Merseysound, a high-quality Liverpool new wave fanzine, and were featured twice on its cover.

Apart from the Peel session, only two other sessions were recorded, 14–15 February 1981 and 6–7 March 1982, both engineered by Peter Coleman at Session One Studios in Liverpool. Merseysound released tracks from the first SOS session on its Tapezine. The track "Looking at Walls" appears to have been bootlegged a few times over the intervening years. More recently, the band has made all recordings available on CD: A Far Cry by A Formal Sigh.

A Formal Sigh gigged regularly in Merseyside and the Northwest. In April 1982 a couple of record companies were just getting interested in signing the band when Flo Sullivan and Robin Surtees decided to leave. They went on to form Shiny Two Shiny. Flo later went solo as Gayna Rose Madder, and Robin joined members of The Room to form Benny Profane. Roger Sinek and Greg Milton reverted to their old band name, Barbel, and continued to play intermittently. Mark Peters emigrated to Australia.

The band took its name from a quotation of Ned Rorem: ‘An artist doesn't necessarily have deeper feelings than other people, but he can express these feelings. He is like everyone else-only more so! He speaks with a Formal Sigh.’

Musical style
A Formal Sigh was always hard to categorise. The female vocal format led some to make questionable comparisons with Siouxsie and the Banshees. Several tracks were redolent of U2. Material ranged from caustic observations of contemporary political situations (in tracks like "Bleak Intrusion" and "Ev Rev") to poignantly worded exposés of troubled relationships and anomie ("There is no Hell" and "Launderette")

External links
 The band's 13-track retrospective CD
 Several images of the band

English new wave musical groups
Musical groups from Liverpool